Magrini is an Italian surname. Notable people with the surname include:

Andrea Magrini (born 1997), Italian football player 
Fabio Magrini (born 1965), Italian weightlifter
Pete Magrini (born 1942), American baseball player
Riccardo Magrini (born 1954), Italian cyclist
Tullia Magrini (1950–2005), Italian anthropologist

See also
Giuseppina Finzi-Magrini (1878–1944), Italian opera singer

Italian-language surnames